Gellért Ivancsics (born 23 February 1987 in Sopron) is a Hungarian football player currently playing for SC Kroatisch Minihof.

References

External links
HLSZ 

1987 births
Living people
People from Sopron
Hungarian footballers
Hungarian expatriate footballers
Association football midfielders
MTK Budapest FC players
BFC Siófok players
FC Sopron players
Budapest Honvéd FC players
Budapest Honvéd FC II players
Diósgyőri VTK players
Szigetszentmiklósi TK footballers
Zalaegerszegi TE players
Lombard-Pápa TFC footballers
Kaposvári Rákóczi FC players
Nemzeti Bajnokság I players
Nemzeti Bajnokság II players
Hungarian expatriate sportspeople in Austria
Expatriate footballers in Austria
Sportspeople from Győr-Moson-Sopron County